Live at Lime with Tom Morello: The Nightwatchman is a two-track benefit album by the Nightwatchman, the alter ego of Tom Morello. Both songs on the album are covers – The Killers' "Human" and Alfred Hayes' "Joe Hill" – which is a first for a Nightwatchman album.  It was recorded in 2009 and released by LimeWire Store on December 11, 2009, as a benefit for Amnesty International. Net proceeds from this release are being donated to the organization.

Track listing

Personnel
Tom Morello – guitar, voice, harmonica
David Gibbs – guitar
Eric Robinson – piano

References

External links 

 Official Nightwatchman Website
 Official Nightwatchman MySpace
 Official Nightwatchman Facebook
 LimeWire Online Store 

The Nightwatchman albums